The Class sketch is a comedy sketch first broadcast in an episode of David Frost's satirical comedy programme The Frost Report on 7 April 1966. It has been described as a "genuinely timeless sketch, ingeniously satirising the British class system" and in 2005 was voted number 40 in Channel Four's "Britain's 50 Greatest Comedy Sketches". It was written by Marty Feldman and John Law, and features John Cleese, Ronnie Barker, and Ronnie Corbett.

Synopsis

Cleese, tall and patrician in appearance and demeanour, represents the upper class; Barker, of average height, the middle class, and Corbett, short in stature, the working class. Each in turn describes their social advantages and disadvantages, and contrasts them with their neighbours, an effect emphasised by the actors' relative heights as they look downwards or upwards to each other: 

It is this situation that gives Corbett the pay-off line; as the others describe their advantages in the form of "I get ... (e.g. a sense of superiority)", his character finally looks up at the others and says "I get a pain in the back of my neck."

Reception and influence
The British Film Institute commented, "Its twinning of height and social position, combined with a minimal script, created a classic TV moment." The sketch's influence has persisted to the present day, having been referred to in 21st-century discussions of politics, sociology, and even football.

Spinoffs
Ronnie Barker wrote scripts for three further "Three Classes" sketches featuring the same characters, comparing their family life, their leisure activities, and their work.

A spinoff sketch was broadcast on the BBC Millennium programme, satirising three eras of English history. Stephen Fry represents Modern Man, Barker a miller from the Renaissance, and Corbett a weaver serf from the Middle Ages. The basic premise of the sketch is no different from the original. The sketch was incorporated into The Nearly Complete and Utter History of Everything.

Cleese revisited the concept as well with two new partners in 2017  (as a Wealthy Man, a Newspaper Editor and an Average Joe) for a political PSA.

References

British comedy
Comedy sketches
1966 in British television
Social class in the United Kingdom